Vuk Vrčević (Risan, 26 February 1811 – Dubrovnik, 13 August 1882)  was a collector of lyric poetry and companion of Vuk Karadžić, the famed linguist and reformer of the Serbian language. He also translated into Serbian the poetical work of Pietro Antonio Domenico Trapessi, better known by his pseudonym Metastasio (1698–1782).

Biography
Vuk Vrčević was born at Risan in Bay of Kotor, then under the rule of the Habsburg monarchy, on 26 February 1811. His family was of Serbian origin and was settled in Boka Kotorska from time immemorial. His parents were in poor circumstances, and he owed his education to his own perseverance. He early developed a gift for languages, becoming familiar not only with Old Slavonic, Russian and Greek, but also Turkish, Latin, Italian, French and  German (thus mastering all the languages spoken by the foreign invaders of his Serbian homeland during the early stages of the 19th century). When he was twenty years old Vrčević's father, a well-respected clerk and schoolteacher who was battling tuberculosis, died suddenly in 1831, leaving his mother and 13 siblings in his care. That same year they all moved to Budva, where Vrčević's first job was in a merchant's office as an agent of a trading company, thanks to his uncle's connections. In 1835 Vuk Stefanović Karadžić was living in nearby Kotor at the time. It was there that Vrčević first made an acquaintance with the great man who had already started to reform and standardize the Serbian language and became his lifelong collaborator in collecting national folk songs and tales. Together with Priest Vuk Popović he collected srbulje in Herzegovina and Montenegro. Three Vuks (Karadžić, Popović and Vrčević) with support of Russian scholars collected almost all remaining srbulje from Montenegro.

Europe had scarcely found respite from the campaigns of Napoleon when Karadžić first reduced Serbian national poems to writing, rescuing these pesme(poems) from that state of oral tradition in which they had remained for ages. For the next six years Vrčević continued to work for the Budva traders and collaborated with Karadžić. In 1841 he decided to become a civil servant in Budva and married a girl from KotorThe revolutionary movement of 1848 had marked Boka Kotorska to a degree. Vrčević was obliged to quit his post and he became a translator at a Kotor tribunal. Vrčević's career as a man of letters appears to have turned almost by accident; his fine voice gained him a place in the Cetinje household of Danilo I, Prince of Montenegro in 1852, and by-and-by, having already some reputation as a Latinist, he was chosen to teach Danilo, the nephew of Petar II Petrović-Njegoš, Italian, then an important language in the Venetian-occupied, Serbian-speaking Adriatic region. The prince immediately took him and his wife and children under his protection. But this idyllic situation did not remain for long. In 1855 an Austrian invasion of Montenegro became imminent and Vrčević decided to leave Cetinjefor Zadar, the capital of Dalmatia. Before he left, the prince showed Vrčević further favour by bestowing on him the habit of the military order of the Independence of Montenegro (Order of Prince Danilo I). Upon his arrival at Zadar, he received an appointment in the City Hall, a clerkship that offered more solid prospects, in the Dalmatian revenue administration. For the next five years, he worked hard and his eyesight began to fail. Through the influence of Austrian Baron Lazar Mamula (1795–1878), then Governor of Dalmatia (1850–1868), Vrčević was in 1861 appointed Austrian vice-consul at Trebinje in Herzegovina, considered one of the most volatile regions in Europe. No sooner had he entered on his new duties than his great capacity for arduous work was put to a test. Besides events in the Serbian Vojvodina and the new repercussions from the Magyars, to which he had to devote much attention, the Herzegovinian insurrection, led by Luka Vukalović (1823-1873) in 1852, had broken out once again (1861–1862), and Vrčević could perceive from secret official dispatches and from his own personal contacts that the incident was bound to have far-reaching ramifications sooner or later. Vrčević passed the remainder of his life in the vice-consular office in Trebinje. He died at Dubrovnik on 13 August 1882. 
 
He was honoured with special recognition from the Serbian Learned Society (inducted on 21 January 1868), and was a particular favourite of Milan I of Serbia and Nicholas I of Montenegro, who made him historiographer royal.

Work and legacy

Vrčević began his literary career by publishing translations from the poetic work of Italian poet Pietro Antonio Domenico Trapassi, better known by his pseudonym Pietro Metastasio in 1839. In Montenegro he wrote Moralno zabavne i saljivo poučno zagonetke. Ascension songs (Spasovske pesme) disappeared quite early. Vuk Vrčević managed to record the surviving remnants of the ancient tradition while in Montenegro (Budva) and sent them to Vuk Karadžić, who included them in the already completed text of his first volume of folk songs on the basis of their aesthetic quality and unique character. At the time comic tales were neglected for the sole reason that such tales did not enhance the evolution of mythological subjects, and were often referred to as refuse of golden tradition. With Vrčević, however, an exception was made. He supplied the first classification of comic tales.

In Herzegovina Vrčević came in touch with the Serb Moslem folk at Trebinje in 1861. (After the Turks overran the Serb lands, namely Herzegovina and Bosnia in the 15th century, the people found it to their temporal advantage to become Moslems). Vrčević wrote to Vuk Karadžić that he had heard of Stolac a place which excels in "Turks who are most skilled in singing folk songs in Herzegovina, but I do not know how to bring one to Trebinje, or how to get there myself both things being equally hard." With an almost modern realism Vrčević reproduced the motley world of the old, oral tradition of the guslars, at the same time not losing sight of their literary value. After all, they came to express the deep heart of a Serbian nation, through centuries of tempest and travail. In 1866 in Trebinje, Herzegovina, he wrote Srpske Narodne Pesme u Herzegovini (Serbian National Poems) and Tužbalice (Laments). Two books of his were published in 1868 by the Srpsko naučno društvo (Serbian Learned Society) in Belgrade: Srpske narodne pripovetke, kratke i šaljive (Serbian Folk Tales, Short and Humorous) and Narodne igre (National Dances). In 1870 two more books were published in Belgrade by the same society: Junačke pesme (Heroic Poems where he mentions the deeds of Revolutionary Serbia's vojvodes such as Novica Cerović, Šujo Karadži and many others), and Narodne poslovice (National Proverbs). He published in Belgrade many Serbian translations of foreign works, but his chief glory was the collection of national songs which he sent to Vuk Karadžić for publication in Vienna.

References

Sources 

 Jovan Skerlić, Istorije nove srpske kniževnosti (Belgrade, 1921), pages 239–275
 Hrvatska Lipa Magazine, Vol. I, No. 28, 1875, pages 228 and 233.
 Милићевић, Милан Ђ. (1888). Поменик знаменитих људи у српског народа новијега доба.
 Гавриловић, Андра (2008). Знаменити Срби XIX вијека. Београд: Научна КМД.

Serbian writers
Bay of Kotor
1811 births
1882 deaths
Linguists from Montenegro
Montenegrin writers
Montenegrin male writers
Serbs of Montenegro